The Campus Market is an online marketplace that is exclusive to college students. The marketplace gives students the ability to sell or procure items with other students at their place of learning. The stated mission of The Campus Market is to promote sustainable reuse on campus within any given campus community. The Campus Market was launched on January 1, 2015 and requires an .edu e-mail address to sign up.

Marketplace 
The company was founded by Brad Stinson, a 2012 graduate of Trinity University. He launched the company initially to serve Duke University in February 2015.

Central to the experience on The Campus Market are the self-contained marketplaces. This means that students will only see listings from other students at their school. The system works on a trust system whereby all participants know they are part of the same campus community.

In its first year, the company grew the service up to 22 colleges on the east coast, serving over 18,000 students who signed up for the service.

References

External links

See also
 Marketplace
 Peer-to-peer
 Recommerce
 Reuse
 Sharing economy

Companies based in Charlotte, North Carolina
Online marketplaces of the United States